Kivimaa is the 6th district of the city of Lahti, in the region of Päijät-Häme, Finland.

The population of the statistical district of Kivimaa was 4,157 in 2019.

References 

Districts of Lahti